William Alexander Archibald Hamilton, 11th Duke of Hamilton and 8th Duke of Brandon (19 February 1811 – 8 July 1863) styled Earl of Angus before 1819 and Marquess of Douglas and Clydesdale between 1819 and 1852, was a Scottish nobleman and the Premier Peer of Scotland.

He was the son of Alexander Hamilton, 10th Duke of Hamilton and Susan Euphemia Beckford, daughter of English novelist William Beckford. He was educated at Eton and Christ Church, Oxford. He was Knight Marischal of Scotland from 1846 and Lord Lieutenant of Lanarkshire from 1852 until his death.

At the Mannheim Palace, on 23 February 1843, he married Princess Marie Amélie of Baden, daughter of the Grand Duke Charles of Baden and Stéphanie de Beauharnais, the adopted daughter of Napoleon I. After his marriage he lived chiefly in Paris and Baden, taking very little interest in British affairs. They had three children:

 William Douglas-Hamilton, 12th Duke of Hamilton (1845–1895)
 Lieutenant Charles George Douglas-Hamilton, 7th Earl of Selkirk (1847–1886), 11th Hussars
 Lady Mary Victoria Hamilton (1850–1922), married firstly Albert I, Prince of Monaco, latterly to Prince Tassilo Festetics de Tolna.

Though he had married in 1843, the duke did not succeed to his title until 1852. In that year, he purchased the house located at 22 Arlington Street in St. James's, a district of the City of Westminster in central London from Henry Somerset, 7th Duke of Beaufort for £60,000. The duke lavished expenses on the house for approximately a decade, including installing iron firebacks with his coronet and motto. Upon his death, the house passed to his widow who sold it to Ivor Guest, 1st Baron Wimborne via auction in 1867.

Ancestry

References

External links 
 
 William, 11th Duke of Hamilton: Hamilton Palace

|-

1811 births
1863 deaths
Alumni of Christ Church, Oxford
111
108
08
William Douglas-Hamilton, 11th Duke of Hamilton
Lord-Lieutenants of Lanarkshire
People educated at Eton College
William